2000 Vana Ufan Dhuvas (Eng: 2000th birthday) is a 2000 Maldivian horror drama film written and directed by Easa Shareef. Produced by Ahmed Wafau under Genius Movies, the film stars Reeko Moosa Manik, Jamsheedha Ahmed, Ali Seezan and Mariyam Shakeela in pivotal roles.

Synopsis
Sudha (Jamsheedha Ahmed), a peculiar woman moves into a live-in relationship with Vishan (Reeko Moosa Manik) who is already married to a light-hearted woman, Shakeela Mariyam Shakeela. Sudha and Vishan continues their affair while Shakeela, who is now pregnant to a child of Vishan, helplessly watches them romance. Meanwhile Sudha's identical twin, Shiuna is involved in a romantic relationship with Vishan's best friend, Latheef (Ali Seezan). In guilt, Shiuna explains to Latheef that they are in fact not twins but lookalikes, and she is involved in their game because Sudha begged her to act as her twin-sister. Latheef suspects Sudha is a fraud and is secretly working to desperately achieve something for her benefit. The following day, Latheef is drowned in the sea.

Cast 
 Reeko Moosa Manik as Vishan
 Jamsheedha Ahmed as Sudha / Shiuna / Reema
 Ali Seezan as Latheef
 Mariyam Shakeela as Shakeela
 Ali Shameel as Mohamed Fulhu
 Fauziyya Hassan as Shareefa
 Mariyam Haleem as Zubeidha
 Shafaza (Special appearance)
 Hawwa Dheena (Special appearance)

Soundtrack

References

2000 films
Maldivian horror films
Films directed by Easa Shareef